Back Home is the second album by Bearfoot Bluegrass, released 2003.  The album was recorded and mixed at The Vineyard Studio, Todd Phillips' studio in Redwood Valley, California. The band traveled to Todd Phillips studio three times to have him produce the album. In the liner notes, Phillips wrote "I am very proud of Bearfoot Bluegrass. Right before my eyes they have evolved from enthusiastic, talented kids into seasoned musicians -- now with a high caliber recording to their credit."

Track listing

Personnel 
Bearfoot
Angela Oudean – Vocals, Fiddle, Guitar
Annalisa Woodlee – Vocals, Fiddle, Viola
Kate Hamre – Vocals, Acoustic Bass
Mike Mickelson – Vocals, Guitar
Jason Norris – Mandolin

References

External links 

2003 albums
Bearfoot (American band) albums